The 2022 United States Senate election in North Carolina was held on November 8, 2022 to elect a member of the United States Senate to represent the State of North Carolina. Primary elections were scheduled for March 8, 2022, but were delayed by the North Carolina Supreme Court and rescheduled for May 17.

Incumbent three-term Republican U.S. senator Richard Burr announced in 2016 that he would not seek reelection in 2022. Former Chief Justice of the North Carolina Supreme Court Cheri Beasley and U.S. Representative Ted Budd won the Democratic and Republican primaries, respectively. The race was considered competitive, with Budd narrowly leading in polls. Budd ultimately won with 50.5% of the vote to Beasley's 47.3% — a margin of 3.2%.

Republican primary

With Burr's retirement, this primary was expected to be very competitive. Former U.S. Representative Mark Walker was the first major candidate to announce his candidacy, on December 1, 2020. Walker opted to retire from the House and not run for reelection in 2020 because his district was made much more favorable to the Democratic Party after redistricting. Former President Donald Trump's daughter-in-law Lara Trump was widely speculated as a possible candidate for this seat. She received encouragement and support from U.S. Senator Lindsey Graham and Kellyanne Conway, a former Trump White House official. Early opinion polls suggested she would perform well against other prospective candidates in the primary. On April 14, 2021, former Governor Pat McCrory announced his candidacy. U.S. Representative Ted Budd announced his candidacy on April 28, 2021.

Opinion polls taken during April 2021 showed McCrory with a wide lead over Walker and Budd. McCrory was aided by a high degree of name recognition because of his several statewide campaigns.

On June 5, 2021, the North Carolina Republican Party held a convention in Greenville. At the convention, former President Trump announced that he was endorsing Budd for the U.S. Senate seat. Lara Trump announced that she would not be running, and joined her father-in-law in endorsing Budd. The former president also took a shot at McCrory, saying, "You can't pick people that have already lost two races, that do not stand for our values." McCrory lost both the 2008 and 2016 gubernatorial elections. Budd was reportedly unaware of Trump's intentions until 15 minutes before he took the stage. Both Walker and McCrory stated their intentions to stay in the race.

Meanwhile, North Carolina redrew its congressional maps, making Walker's house seat more favorable to Republicans than it had been before 2020. After that, Trump met with Walker and promised to endorse him if he left the Senate race to instead run for his old House seat, newly numbered as the 7th district. Walker filed to switch races, but later decided against it in favor of staying in the Senate race.

The first primary debate was held on February 26 in Raleigh. It was sponsored by the John Locke Foundation, a conservative think tank based in North Carolina. McCrory, Walker and Eastman participated. Budd was invited, but did not attend, leaving an empty podium. The first televised debate was held by WRAL-TV on April 14 and featured McCrory and Walker, with Budd once again declining to attend. A third debate was held on April 20 on Spectrum News 1. McCrory, Walker, and Eastman participated. A fourth debate, sponsored by Nexstar Media Group, was held on April 26 and aired on television stations across North Carolina, including WJZY, WNCN, WGHP, and WNCT-TV. McCrory and Walker participated. Budd declined and Eastman was not invited.

Budd won the primary overwhelmingly with over 58% of the vote. McCrory finished second with almost 25%, and Walker third with 9%. Budd won a plurality in every county in the state except for Mecklenburg, which McCrory won by under 100 votes. After the results were released, McCrory declared his political career over. He did not endorse Budd for the general election.

Candidates

Nominee
Ted Budd, U.S. Representative for NC-13 (2017–2023)

Eliminated in primary
Jen Banwart, Department of Defense employee (2001–2020), and legislative staffer on Capitol Hill (1994–1996)
Lee Brian, videographer and withdrawn candidate for NC-04 in 2018
Leonard Bryant, Senior Religious Affairs Advisor for the United States Army
Drew Bulecza, businessman
Marjorie Eastman, author and veteran
David Flaherty, former State Representative
Benjamin Griffiths
Kenneth Harper, business owner
Pat McCrory, former governor of North Carolina (2013–2017), former mayor of Charlotte (1995–2009)
Charles Kenneth Moss, radio evangelist and former member of the Randolph County Soil & Water Board
Lichia Sibhatu, daycare owner
Debora Tshiovo
Mark Walker, former U.S. Representative for NC-06 (2015–2021)

Withdrawn
Marty Cooke, Brunswick County Commissioner (since 2008)

Declined
Richard Burr, incumbent U.S. Senator (endorsed Pat McCrory)
Virginia Foxx, U.S. Representative for NC-5 (2005–present)
Mark Meadows, former White House chief of staff, former U.S. Representative for NC-11 and former chairman of the Freedom Caucus (2013–2020) (endorsed Ted Budd)
Tim Moore, Speaker of the North Carolina House of Representatives (2015–present) (running for reelection)
Mark Robinson, lieutenant governor of North Carolina (2021–present)
Lara Trump, television producer, senior advisor to Donald Trump's 2020 presidential campaign, and daughter-in-law of former President of the United States Donald Trump (endorsed Ted Budd)
Michael Whatley, chair of the North Carolina Republican Party
Dan Forest, former Lieutenant Governor of North Carolina (2013–2021) and nominee for governor in 2020

Endorsements

Polling

Graphical summary

Aggregate polls

Debates

Results

Democratic primary
After losing the 2020 Democratic primary for United States Senate, Erica Smith teased a campaign for the other Senate seat in 2022. She officially launched her campaign in March 2021. Jeff Jackson, who has represented the 37th district in the North Carolina Senate since 2014, was widely speculated as a potential candidate for U.S. Senate in 2020, but decided to run for reelection to the State Senate instead. In fall 2020, Jackson said he would discuss a potential 2022 campaign with his family over the holiday season. In January 2021, Jackson officially launched his campaign, and began a tour of the state, holding town hall events in all 100 counties. Cheri Beasley narrowly lost her election to a full term as Chief Justice in 2020. In February 2021, it was reported that she had hired a campaign consultant and was preparing to enter the U.S. Senate race. Beasley officially launched her campaign on April 27.

In November 2021, Smith filed papers to run for North Carolina's 2nd congressional district in 2022 after Representative G. K. Butterfield announced he would not seek reelection. On November 23, Smith officially launched her House campaign and ended her Senate campaign. She endorsed Beasley on November 30.

On December 16, 2021, Jackson withdrew from the race and endorsed Beasley, making Beasley the presumptive nominee.

Beasley easily won the nomination with over 81% of the vote.

Candidates

Nominee
 Cheri Beasley, former justice of the North Carolina Supreme Court (2012–2020; Chief Justice 2019–2020)

Eliminated in primary
Greg Antoine, physician 
Chrelle Booker, Tryon city councillor (2019–present)
James L. Carr Jr. 
Robert Colon 
Alyssia Rose-Katherine Hammond 
 Constance Johnson, perennial candidate
Tobias LaGrone, business owner, pastor, and counselor
B. K. Maginnis 
 Rett Newton, former mayor of Beaufort (2017–2021)
Marcus Williams, attorney and perennial candidate

Withdrawn
 Jeff Jackson, state senator (2014–present) and major in the North Carolina National Guard (running for NC-14) (endorsed Beasley)
 Erica D. Smith, former state senator (running for NC-01) (endorsed Beasley)
 Richard Watkins III, scientist and candidate for NC-04 in 2018 (running for NC-04)

Declined
Mandy Cohen, Secretary of the North Carolina Department of Health and Human Services (2017–present)
Roy Cooper, Governor of North Carolina (2017–present)
Terence Everitt, state representative
Deborah K. Ross, U.S. Representative from NC-2
Sydney Batch, state senator (2021–present)
Anita Earls, associate justice of the North Carolina Supreme Court (2019–present)
Anthony Foxx, former United States Secretary of Transportation (2013–2017) and former mayor of Charlotte (2009–2013)
Joan Higginbotham, electrical engineer and former NASA astronaut
Vi Lyles, Mayor of Charlotte (2017–present) (running for re-election)
Grier Martin, state representative (2005–present)
Heath Shuler, former U.S. Representative for NC-11 (2007–2013)

Endorsements

Polling

Graphical summary

Results

Independents and third-party candidates

Libertarian Party

Declared
Shannon W. Bray, author, U.S. Navy veteran, candidate for NC-03 in 2019 and nominee for U.S. Senate in 2020

Green Party

Declared
Matthew Hoh, activist and veteran

Independents

Write-in candidates
Michelle Lewis, Activist

Failed to make general election ballot
Kimrey Rhinehardt, University of North Carolina Wilmington faculty member, former lobbyist for the University of North Carolina system, and former staffer for incumbent U.S. Senator Richard Burr
Brenda Rodriguez, veteran

General election

Debates

Predictions

Endorsements

Fundraising 
In the first quarter of 2022, Beasley raised $3.6 million. In the second quarter of 2022, Beasley reported raising $7.42 million, narrowly beating a second quarter record set by Cal Cunningham in 2020.

Polling
Aggregate polls

Graphical summary

Marjorie Eastman vs. Cheri Beasley

Pat McCrory vs. Cheri Beasley

Mark Walker vs. Cheri Beasley

Generic Republican vs. generic Democrat

Results

See also 
 2022 United States Senate elections
 2022 North Carolina judicial elections
 2022 North Carolina elections

Notes

Partisan clients

References

External links 
Official campaign websites
 Cheri Beasley (D) for Senate
 Shannon W. Bray (L) for Senate
 Ted Budd (R) for Senate
 Matthew Hoh (G) for Senate
 Kimrey Rhinehardt (I) for Senate
 Brenda Rodriguez (I) for Senate

2022
North Carolina
United States Senate